The 1973 US Open was a tennis tournament that took place on the outdoor grass courts at the West Side Tennis Club in Forest Hills, Queens, in New York City, United States. The tournament ran from 27 August until 9 September. It was the 93rd staging of the US Open, and the fourth Grand Slam tennis event of 1973. It was the first year the boy's championship was held. The 1973 US Open was the first Grand Slam offering equal prize money to both men and women.

Seniors

Men's singles

 John Newcombe defeated  Jan Kodeš, 6–4, 1–6, 4–6, 6–2, 6–3  
• It was Newcombe's 6th career Grand Slam singles title, his 4th in the Open Era and his 2nd and last title at the US Open.

Women's singles

 Margaret Court defeated  Evonne Goolagong, 7–6, 5–7, 6–2 
• It was Court's 24th and last career Grand Slam singles title, her 11th in the Open Era and her 5th title at the US Open.

Men's doubles

 Owen Davidson /  John Newcombe defeated  Rod Laver /  Ken Rosewall, 7–5, 2–6, 7–5, 7–5  
• It was Davidson's 2nd and last career Grand Slam doubles title and his 1st and only title at the US Open.
• It was Newcombe's 15th career Grand Slam doubles title, his 9th in the Open Era and his 3rd and last title at the US Open.

Women's doubles

 Margaret Court /  Virginia Wade defeated  Rosemary Casals /  Billie Jean King, 3–6, 6–3, 7–5

Mixed doubles

 Billie Jean King /  Owen Davidson defeated  Margaret Court /  Marty Riessen, 6–3, 3–6, 7–6

Juniors

Boys' singles
 Billy Martin defeated  Colin Dowdeswell, 4–6, 6–3, 6–3

Prize money

Total prize money for the event was $227,200.

References

External links
Official US Open website

 
 

 
US Open
US Open (tennis) by year
US Open (tennis)
US Open
US Open
US Open